Drama Stage is a South Korean weekly television program that features ten one-act dramas, which is similar to KBS2's Drama Special. The short plays were created by writers selected from the O'PEN Drama Storyteller Exhibition. O'PEN writers were recruited through an open call between January and March 2017. A total of 3,700 aspiring writers applied for competition with scripts for dramas or films during the contest period of about two months. Dozen of various drama and film industry officials judged the script in two to three rounds. The jury finally selected 35 new writers, including 20 new drama writers and 15 new movie writers. held by CJ E&M, and these are adapted as one-act dramas produced by the former's subsidiary Studio Dragon in partnership with other companies. It aired on tvN every Saturday at midnight.

On April 15 2022, it was announced by tvN that with season 5 the name of Drama Stage will be changed to 'O'PENing'. The 'Drama Stage', aired only one-act plays, but 'O'PENing' will broadcast two series and eight one-act episodes.

Episodes

See also
 Drama Special
 Drama Festa

Notes

References

External links
  
 Drama Stage at Naver 
 

 
2017 South Korean television series debuts
Korean-language television shows
South Korean anthology television series
Television series by Studio Dragon
TVN (South Korean TV channel) television dramas